Patrick James Leonard (May 19, 1847 – January 1, 1899) was a United States Army sergeant who received the Medal of Honor during the Indian Wars.  Until 1984, it was believed that Leonard was a double recipient of the Medal of Honor.  However, another Irishman, Patrick Thomas Leonard, had also received the Medal of Honor.

Early life and education
Leonard was born in County Meath, Ireland.

Military career
Leonard enlisted at Cincinnati, Ohio.  His actions as a sergeant at the Little Blue River near Little Blue, Nebraska on May 15, 1870, led to him being awarded the Medal of Honor on June 22, 1870.  While searching for stray horses near the river, Leonard and four other soldiers were ambushed by 50 Indians.  The men were able to kill three Indians, and wound seven.  After repelling the attack, Leonard then escorted two women and a child to the nearest settlement.  The other four soldiers (Pvt. Thomas Hubbard, Pvt. Heth Canfield, Pvt. Michael Himmelsback, Pvt. George W. Thompson) also received Medals of Honor.

Death and legacy
Leonard died on January 1, 1899, and was buried in Saint Joseph Cemetery, New Almelo, Kansas.

Medal of Honor citation
Rank and organization: Sergeant, Company C, 2d U.S. Cavalry. Place and date: At Little Blue, Nebr., May 15, 1870. Entered service at: ------. Birth: Ireland. Date of issue: June 22, 1870.

Citation:

Gallantry in action.

See also

List of Medal of Honor recipients
List of Medal of Honor recipients for the Indian Wars

References

1847 births
1899 deaths
19th-century Irish people
Irish soldiers in the United States Army
People from County Meath
American people of the Indian Wars
United States Army Medal of Honor recipients
Irish-born Medal of Honor recipients
Irish emigrants to the United States (before 1923)
United States Army soldiers
American Indian Wars recipients of the Medal of Honor